Vairelles is a surname. Notable people with the surname include:

David Vairelles (born 1977), French footballer, cousin of Tony
Tony Vairelles (born 1973), French footballer